Jan van Raalte (Hattem, 12 August 1968) is a Dutch football manager of amateur squads and formerly a professional footballer, mostly in the Eerste Divisie and one season with Cambuur Leeuwarden in the Eredivisie. Van Raalte won the Rinus Michels Award for coaching amateur teams. He lives in Harkema where he finished his midfield player career.

Football career
Van Raalte played four seasons for FC Zwolle, after which he played 1993 to 1995 for Cambuur Leeuwarden. Then Van Raalte played for Emmen. Starting in 1999, his last two seasons in the Eerste Divisie were at VVV Venlo, followed by three years for Harkemase Boys in the Hoofdklasse.

Until 2009 Van Raalte managed HHC Hardenberg. In 2012 he became the coach of VV Staphorst. Since 2016 he manages SC Genemuiden but has notified the club he will take a break from coaching starting summer 2019.

Player statistics

References

1968 births
Living people
Dutch footballers
Dutch football managers
FC Emmen players
PEC Zwolle players
SC Cambuur players
VVV-Venlo players
Footballers from Friesland
Footballers from Gelderland
People from Achtkarspelen
People from Hattem
Association football midfielders
Rinus Michels Award winners